Radio Silence is the eighth studio album by American rapper Talib Kweli. It was released on November 17, 2017 through Talib's Javotti Media.

The album was preceded by four promotional audio releases: "Let It Roll", "She's My Hero", "Heads Up Eyes Open" featuring Rick Ross and Yummy Bingham, and "Traveling Light" featuring Anderson .Paak. "Heads Up Eyes Open" saw a video release prior to the album's release date while the video for "Traveling Light" was released on November 17.

The album's other guests include Jay Electronica, Waka Flocka Flame, Amber Coffman, Bilal, and Robert Glasper.

This is Talib's fifth solo studio album released under his Javotti Media record label.

Background

Talib Kweli first publicly mentioned that he was working on Radio Silence in 2016. Since the announcement, Talib released Fuck The Money and The Seven, a collaborative effort with Styles P of The Lox.

Track listing
Credits adapted from the liner notes of Radio Silence by Javotti Media.

Sources 

Talib Kweli albums
2017 albums